Cleph (also Clef, Clepho, or Kleph) was king of the Lombards from 572 to 574.

He succeeded Alboin, to whom he was not related by blood.  He was a violent and terrifying figure to the Romans and Byzantines struggling to maintain control of the Italian Peninsula.  He extended Lombard dominion over all of Northern Italy, finishing the conquest of Tuscany and bringing Lombard authority to the gates of Ravenna.  He was assassinated after an 18-month reign by a young guard, a slave whom he had mistreated. His death was followed by a 10-year interregnum, known as the Rule of the Dukes because the territorial dukes were supreme.  His son, Authari, eventually took the throne in 585.

Notes 

574 deaths
6th-century Lombard monarchs
Lombard warriors
6th-century murdered monarchs
Year of birth unknown